Hopperia is a genus of nematodes belonging to the family Comesomatidae.

The genus has cosmopolitan distribution.

Species:

Hopperia americana 
Hopperia ancora 
Hopperia arntzi 
Hopperia australis 
Hopperia beaglense 
Hopperia communis 
Hopperia dolichura 
Hopperia dorylaimopsoides 
Hopperia hexadentata 
Hopperia indiana 
Hopperia macramphida 
Hopperia massiliensis 
Hopperia mira 
Hopperia muscatensis 
Hopperia novazelandica 
Hopperia patagonica 
Hopperia sinensis

References

Nematodes